Judy Ann Strangis (born December 23, 1949) is an American actress. She is best known for her roles in two ABC television series Room 222 (1969–1974) and Electra Woman and Dyna Girl (1976–1977).



Early years
Strangis is a native of California. She attended University High School in West Los Angeles. Her brother Sam was a director, producer, and studio executive, and her cousin Greg wrote for television. Singer Helen Grayco is her aunt. Her sister, Linda (known professionally as Cindy Malone) was a singer and actress.

Career

Acting
Strangis' first appearance was in the 1957 movie Dragoon Wells Massacre, when she was seven years old.  For the next 27 years, she was regularly cast in small and guest starring roles in television shows.

In 1969, Judy was cast as high school student Helen Loomis in the popular ABC show Room 222.  She played this role for four years.

In 1976, she was cast as the sidekick super heroine DynaGirl in the Saturday morning TV show Electra Woman and Dyna Girl where she co-starred with Deidre Hall.  To date, this is Judy's most famous role and has achieved her cult stature amongst Krofft fans.  Her nephew, writer/producer Greg Strangis, wrote two episodes in this series.

Other appearances include roles on The Spike Jones Show (Jones was her uncle), The Twilight Zone ("The Bard"), The Mod Squad ("Outside Position"), and Bewitched.  Judy appeared twice as an extra on Batman; her brother, Sam Strangis, was a production manager on the show.  Judy appeared in the TV Movies All My Darling Daughters (11/22/1972) and My Darling Daughters' Anniversary (11/08/1973).  She appeared in a season 4 episode of Love American Style titled, "Love and the Mind Reader" (03/02/1973) and also appeared in the first season of a Barnaby Jones episode titled, "Sing a Song of Murder" (04/01/1973).  Judy appeared in the series CHiPs season 3 episode titled, "Kidnap" (01/26/1980) and a season 5 episode titled, "Moonlight" (10/18/1981).  In 1984 she guest starred in an episode of The A-Team titled, "In Plane Sight".

Voice-overs
Strangis began doing voice-overs in Saturday morning cartoons in 1972 with William Hanna and Joseph Barbera's The Roman Holidays, Butch Cassidy in 1973, as well as Wheelie and the Chopper Bunch in 1974 and continued performing cartoon voice-overs for the next 10 years for series including Goldie Gold and Action Jack, Saturday Supercade and MoonDreamers.

Advertisements
From 1974 to 1975, Strangis was a pitchwoman for Chrysler Corporation in the role of "Mean Mary Jean". Wearing a football jersey and short denim hot-pants, she promoted the Plymouth Duster, Plymouth Volare, and Plymouth Road Runner models and often appeared at Chrysler promotions and auto shows around the country.

In 1976, Judy became a pitchwoman for Mattel's Barbie product line.

Personal life
Strangis is the niece of 1940s band leader,  comedian, TV star and RCA Victor recording artist Spike Jones and the sister of notable producer and television director Sam Strangis (Batman, The Brady Bunch, The Odd Couple, The Six Million Dollar Man).

Judy married Jayson Sher in 1987.

Awards and nominations

References

External links

American television actresses
American voice actresses
Living people
1949 births
Actresses from Los Angeles
American child actresses
21st-century American women